"Uncle Pen" is a song written and originally recorded by Bill Monroe.  Besides Monroe, the song was recorded by Porter Wagoner in 1956, Goose Creek Symphony in 1971, Michael Nesmith of The Monkees in 1973 on his solo album Pretty Much Your Standard Ranch Stash, and Ricky Skaggs in 1984. The song was Skaggs' ninth #1 single on the country chart. The single went to #1 for one week and spent a total of 13 weeks on the country chart. Bill Monroe played a character named "Uncle Pen" disappointed at the citification of Ricky Skaggs in the 1985 video for "Country Boy". The improvisational-rock band Phish has performed their version of "Uncle Pen" over 200 times in the band's 30+ year career. Leon Russell recorded the song as "Hank Wilson" in 1973.

Content
The song was about Monroe's uncle and musical mentor, Pendleton Vandiver.

Chart performance

Porter Wagoner

Ricky Skaggs

Year-end charts

References
 

1956 songs
1956 singles
1984 singles
Porter Wagoner songs
Ricky Skaggs songs
Epic Records singles
Songs written by Bill Monroe
Song recordings produced by Ricky Skaggs